Francis James Anderson MacKenzie (April 14, 1873 – July 6, 1932) was a Canadian politician. He served in the Legislative Assembly of British Columbia from 1909 to 1920 from the electoral district of Delta, a member of the Conservative party.

References

1873 births
1932 deaths
British Columbia Conservative Party MLAs
People from Bruce County